Kalitheerthan Kamaraj is an Indian politician from Tamil Nadu, India. He is the AIADMK candidate from the Kallakurichi constituency in the April 2014 Indian Lok Sabha parliamentary elections.

Early life and education 
Kamaraj was born on 7 July 1966 at Somandargudi village in Sankarapuram circle, Villupuram district in Tamil Nadu, India.  His father S. Kalitheerthan, was a two-time Member of the Legislative Assembly (1980 and 1985) representing the Sankarapuram constituency in the government headed by Chief Minister M. G. Ramachandran.  His mother is Picchayi ammal.

Kamaraj completed his schooling in the Government primary school in Madoor and went to high school at the Government High School at Somandargudi before joining the Sir M.C.T.M Chettiar Higher Secondary School in Chennai to complete his school education.  Joining the Madras Medical College in 1984, he graduated in 1989 as a medical doctor with the M.B.B.S. degree.

Following a one-year stint as senior house surgeon in General Surgery, Kamaraj secured admission to postgraduate course at Madras Medical College in 1992 and received a master's degree in General Surgery (M.S.) in 1994.  He also underwent an MILT Leadership course conducted by the McGrath Institute of Leadership Training in Kolkata in 1987.

Political career 
His entry into the political arena was a natural extension of his social work in the area of health, and he is an active member of the Association of Surgeons of Rural India.  In the AIADMK, Kamaraj holds the position of Secretary of the District Medical Wing, Villupuram (East) and has helped organise free health camps for residents of Kallakurichi district for three years including a major health and blood donation event on 26 February 2012, and a heart health screening camp on 3 March 2013.

Kamaraj was officially nominated to be the AIADMK party's Lok Sabha election candidate from Kallakurichi constituency for the general elections in April 2014.

Dr. K. Kamaraj will be the AIADMK Lok Sabha party secretary.
Dr. K  Kamaraj will be the AIADMK Lok Sabha party whip.

External links
 Candidate list from Kallakurichi constituency

India MPs 2014–2019
1966 births
People from Viluppuram district
All India Anna Dravida Munnetra Kazhagam politicians
Living people
Lok Sabha members from Tamil Nadu